Kyrgyzstan or the Kyrgyz Republic is a landlocked country in Central Asia. Kyrgyzstan is bordered by Kazakhstan to the north, Uzbekistan to the west, Tajikistan to the south, and the People's Republic of China to the east. Its capital and largest city is Bishkek.

Ethnic Kyrgyz make up the majority of the country's 6.6 million people, followed by significant minorities of Uzbeks and Russians. The Kyrgyz language is closely related to other Turkic languages.

Kyrgyzstan's history spans a variety of cultures and empires. Although geographically isolated by its highly mountainous terrain, Kyrgyzstan has been at the crossroads of several great civilizations as part of the Silk Road along with other commercial routes. Inhabited by a succession of tribes and clans, Kyrgyzstan has periodically fallen under larger domination, for example the Turkic nomads, who trace their ancestry to many Turkic states. It was first established as the Yenisei Kyrgyz Khaganate later in the 13th century. Kyrgyzstan was conquered by the Mongols; it regained independence, but was later invaded by Dzungar Khanate. After the fall of Dzhungars, Kyrgyz and Kipchaks were an integral part of Kokand Khanate. In 1876, Kyrgyzstan became part of the Russian Empire, and in 1936, the Kirghiz Soviet Socialist Republic was formed to become a constituent republic of the Soviet Union. Following Mikhail Gorbachev's democratic reforms in the USSR, in 1990 pro-independence candidate Askar Akayev was elected president. On 31 August 1991, Kyrgyzstan declared independence from Moscow and a democratic government was established. Kyrgyzstan attained sovereignty as a nation state after the breakup of the Soviet Union in 1991.

After independence, Kyrgyzstan was officially a unitary presidential republic; after the Tulip Revolution it became a unitary parliamentary republic, although it gradually developed an executive president and was governed as a semi-presidential republic before reverting to a presidential system in 2021. Throughout its existence, the country has continued to endure ethnic conflicts, revolts, economic troubles, transitional governments and political conflict.

Kyrgyzstan is a member of the Commonwealth of Independent States, the Eurasian Economic Union, the Collective Security Treaty Organization, the Shanghai Cooperation Organisation, the Organisation of Islamic Cooperation, the Organization for Security and Cooperation in Europe, the Organisation of Turkic States, the Türksoy community and the United Nations. It is a developing country ranked 118th in the Human Development Index, and is the second poorest country in Central Asia. The country's transitional economy is heavily dependent on deposits of gold, coal and uranium.

Etymology
Kyrgyz is derived from the Turkic word for "We are forty", believed to refer to the forty clans of Manas, a legendary hero who united forty regional clans. -Stan is a suffix in Persian meaning "place of".

The 40-ray sun on the flag of Kyrgyzstan is a reference to those same forty tribes and the graphical element in the sun's center depicts the wooden crown, called tunduk, of a yurt—a portable dwelling traditionally used by nomads in the steppes of Central Asia.

The country's official name is "Kyrgyz Republic", used in international arenas and foreign relations. In the English-speaking world, the spelling Kyrgyzstan is commonly used, while its former name Kirghizia is rarely used.

History

Early history

The Kyrgyz state reached its greatest expansion after defeating the Uyghur Khaganate in 840 AD. From the tenth century the Kyrgyz migrated as far as the Tian Shan range and maintained their dominance over this territory for about 200 years.

There is a storytelling tradition of the Epic of Manas, which involves a warrior who unified all of the scattered tribes into a single nation in the 9th century. The trilogy, an element of the UNESCO Intangible Cultural Heritage List, expresses the memory of the nomadic peoples.

In the 12th century, the Kyrgyz dominion had shrunk to the Altay Range and Sayan Mountains as a result of the Mongol expansion. With the rise of the Mongol Empire in the thirteenth century, the Kyrgyz migrated south. The Kyrgyz peacefully became a part of the Mongol Empire in 1207.

Issyk Kul Lake was a stopover on the Silk Road, a land route for traders, merchants, and other travelers from the Far East to Europe.
Kyrgyz tribes were overrun in the 17th century by the Mongols, in the mid-18th century by the Manchurian Qing dynasty, and in the early 19th century by the Uzbek Khanate of Kokand. Following Ormon's death in 1854, the khanate disintegrated.

Russian conquest

In the late nineteenth century, the eastern part of what is today Kyrgyzstan, mainly the Issyk-Kul Region, was ceded to the Russian Empire by Qing China through the Treaty of Tarbagatai. The territory, then known in Russian as "Kirghizia", was formally incorporated into the Empire in 1876. The Russian takeover was met with numerous revolts, and many of the Kyrgyz opted to relocate to the Pamir Mountains and Afghanistan.

In addition, the suppression of the 1916 rebellion against Russian rule in Central Asia caused many Kyrgyz later to migrate to China. Since many ethnic groups in the region were, and still are, split between neighboring states at a time when borders were more porous and less regulated, it was common to move back and forth over the mountains, depending on where life was perceived as better; this might mean better rains for pasture or better government during oppression.

Soviet Kyrgyzstan (1919–1991)
Soviet power was initially established in the region in 1919, and the Kara-Kyrgyz Autonomous Oblast was created within the Russian Soviet Federative Socialist Republic (SFSR). The phrase Kara-Kirghiz was used until the mid-1920s by the Russians to distinguish them from the Kazakhs, who were also referred to as Kirghiz. On 5 December 1936, the Kirghiz Soviet Socialist Republic was established as a constituent Union Republic of the Soviet Union.

After the Russian Civil War, the period of the New Economic Policy (NEP), began, which lasted roughly to 1928. The Bolsheviks made an effort to establish a standardized tax system, with higher taxes for nomads to discourage the wandering livelihood and they divided the Central Asia region into five nation-states. Kyrgyzstan developed considerably in cultural, educational, and social life, literacy was greatly improved. Economic and social development also was notable. Under Stalin a great focus was put on Kyrgyz national identity, the Soviet state was fighting tribalism as its social organization based on patrilineal kinship contradicted the concept of the modern nation state. From the indigenous perspective described as a difficult and ambivalent process of nation-building, in a region that did not know national institutions or consciousness before.

By the end of the 1920s, the Soviet Union developed a series of five-year plans, centered around industrialization and the collectivization of agriculture, including the creation of huge "kolkhoz" collective farming systems, needed to feed the new workers in the industries. Because of the plan's reliance on rapidity, major economic and cultural changes had to occur, which led to conflicts. In Kyrgyzstan, Russian settlers acquired the best pasture land, creating much hardship for most of its original inhabitants, Kazakh, Kyrgyz and Turkmen nomads, who were also forced to settle down on soil that hadn't enough agricultural potential.
 The changes caused unrest, and between 1928 and 1932, nomads and peasants made it clear through methods like passive resistance that they did not agree with these policies, in the Kirgiziya area also guerrilla opposition occurred. The region suffered relatively more deaths from collectivization than any other.

The early years of glasnost, in the late 1980s, had little effect on the political climate in Kyrgyzstan. However, the Republic's press was permitted to adopt a more liberal stance and to establish a new publication, Literaturny Kirghizstan, by the Union of Writers. Unofficial political groups were forbidden, but several groups that emerged in 1989 to deal with the acute housing crisis were permitted to function.

According to the last Soviet census in 1989, ethnic Kyrgyz made up only 22% of the residents of the northern city of Frunze (now Bishkek), while more than 60% were Russians, Ukrainians, and people from other Slavic nations. Nearly 10% of the capital's population were Jewish (a rather unique fact, for almost any place in the Soviet Union, except the Jewish Autonomous Oblast).

In June 1990, ethnic tensions between Uzbeks and Kyrgyz surfaced in the Osh Region (southern Kyrgyzstan), where Uzbeks form a minority of the population. The tensions between Kyrgyzs and Uzbeks in Osis led to 186 deaths. Attempts to appropriate Uzbek collective farms for housing development triggered the Osh Riots. A state of emergency and curfew were introduced and Askar Akayev, the youngest of five sons born into a family of collective farm workers (in northern Kyrgyzstan), was elected president in October of that same year. 
By then, the Kyrgyzstan Democratic Movement (KDM) had developed into a significant political force with support in Parliament. On 15 December 1990, the Supreme Soviet voted to change the republic's name to the Republic of Kyrgyzstan. The following January, Akayev introduced new government structures and appointed a new cabinet composed mainly of younger, reform-oriented politicians. In February 1991, the name of the capital, Frunze, was changed back to its pre-revolutionary name of Bishkek.

Despite these political moves toward independence, economic realities seemed to work against secession from the Soviet Union. In a referendum on the preservation of the Soviet Union in March 1991, 88.7% of the voters approved the proposal to retain the Soviet Union as a "renewed federation". Nevertheless, secessionist forces pushed Kyrgyzstan's independence through in August of that same year.

On 19 August 1991, when the State Emergency Committee assumed power in Moscow, there was an attempt to depose Akayev in Kyrgyzstan. After the coup collapsed the following week, Akayev and Vice President German Kuznetsov announced their resignations from the Communist Party of the Soviet Union (CPSU), and the entire bureau and secretariat resigned. This was followed by the Supreme Soviet vote declaring independence from the Soviet Union on 31 August 1991 as the Republic of Kyrgyzstan.

According to 2013 Gallup poll, 62% of Kyrgyz people say that the collapse of the Soviet Union harmed their country, while only 16% said that the collapse benefitted it.

Independence
In October 1991, Akayev ran unopposed and was elected president of the new independent Republic by direct ballot, receiving 95 percent of the votes cast. Together with the representatives of seven other Republics that same month, he signed the Treaty of the Economic Community. The new leaders of three out of four Soviet Union's founding republics, Russia, Belarus and Ukraine, on 8 December 1991 signed the Belavezha Accords, denouncing the Union Treaty of 1922, declaring that the Union would cease to exist and proclaimed the Commonwealth of Independent States (CIS) in its place.

On 21 December 1991, Kyrgyzstan agreed with the other four Central Asian Republics, Tajikistan, Turkmenistan, Uzbekistan, Kazakhstan to the  Alma-Ata Protocols, formally entering the Commonwealth with Armenia, Azerbaijan, Kazakhstan, Moldova and Ukraine. Finally, Kyrgyzstan gained full independence on 25 December 1991. The following day, on 26 December 1991, the Soviet Union ceased to exist. In 1992, Kyrgyzstan joined the United Nations and the Organization for Security and Co-operation in Europe (OSCE). On 5 May 1993, the official name changed from the Republic of Kyrgyzstan to the Kyrgyz Republic.

In 2005, an uprising known as the "Tulip Revolution", took place after the parliamentary elections in March 2005, forced President Askar Akayev's resignation on 4 April 2005. Opposition leaders formed a coalition, and a new government was formed under President Kurmanbek Bakiyev and Prime Minister Felix Kulov. The nation's capital was looted during the protests.

Political stability appeared to be elusive, however, as various groups and factions allegedly linked to organized crime jockeyed for power. Three of the 75 members of Parliament elected in March 2005 were assassinated, and another member was assassinated on 10 May 2006 shortly after winning his murdered brother's seat in a by-election. All four are reputed to have been directly involved in major illegal business ventures.

April 2010 crisis 
On 6 April 2010, civil unrest broke out in the town of Talas after a demonstration against government corruption and increased living expenses. The protests became violent, spreading to Bishkek by the following day. Protesters attacked President Bakiyev's offices, as well as state-run radio and television stations. There were conflicting reports that Interior Minister Moldomusa Kongatiyev had been beaten. On 7 April 2010, President Bakiyev imposed a state of emergency. Police and special services arrested many opposition leaders. In response, protesters took control of the internal security headquarters (former KGB headquarters) and a state television channel in the capital, Bishkek. Reports by Kyrgyzstan government officials indicated that at least 75 people were killed and 458 hospitalized in bloody clashes with police in the capital. Reports say that at least 80 people died as a result of clashes with police.

A transition government has been established, led by former foreign minister Roza Otunbayeva ( Social Democratic Party of Kyrgyzstan), that by 8 April 2010 had taken control of state media and government facilities in the capital, but Bakiyev had not resigned from office.

President Bakiyev returned to his home in Jalal-Abad and stated his terms of resignation at a press conference on 13 April 2010. On 15 April 2010, Bakiyev left the country and flew to neighboring Kazakhstan, along with his wife and two children. The country's provisional leaders announced that Bakiyev signed a formal letter of resignation prior to his departure.

Prime Minister Daniar Usenov accused Russia of supporting the protests; this accusation was denied by Russian Prime Minister, Vladimir Putin. Opposition members also called for the closing of the US-controlled Manas Air Base. Russia's President Dmitry Medvedev ordered measures to ensure the safety of Russian nationals and tighten security around Russian sites in Kyrgyzstan to protect them against possible attacks.

The 2010 South Kyrgyzstan ethnic clashes occurred between the two main ethnic groups—the Uzbeks and Kyrgyz—in Osh, the second-largest city in the country, on 11 June 2010. The clashes incited fears that the country could be heading towards a civil war.

Interim leader Otunbayeva sent a letter to the Russian president, Dimitry Medvedev, asking him to send Russian troops to help the country control the situation. Medvedev's Press Attaché, Natalya Timakova, said in a reply to the letter, "It is an internal conflict and for now Russia does not see the conditions for taking part in its resolution". The clashes caused a shortage of food and other essential commodities with more than 200 killed and 1,685 people hurt, . The Russian government, however, said it would be sending humanitarian aid to the troubled nation.

According to local sources, there was a clash between two local gangs and it did not take long for the violence to spread to the rest of the city. There were also reports that the armed forces supported ethnic Kyrgyz gangs entering the city, but the government denied the allegations.

The riots spread to neighboring areas, and the government declared a state of emergency in the entire southern Jalal-Abad region. To control the situation, the interim government gave special shoot-to-kill powers to the security forces. The Russian government decided to send a battalion to the country to protect Russian facilities.

Otunbayeva accused the family of Bakiyev of "instigating the riots". AFP reported "a veil of smoke covering the whole city". Authorities in neighboring Uzbekistan said at least 30,000 Uzbeks had crossed the border to escape the riots. Osh became relatively calm on 14 June 2010, but Jalal-Abad witnessed sporadic incidents of arson. The entire region was still under a state of emergency as Uzbeks were reluctant to leave their houses for fear of attacks by the mobs. The United Nations decided to send an envoy to assess the situation.

Temir Sariyev, deputy chief of the interim government, said there were local clashes and that it was not possible [for the government] to fully control the situation. He added that there were not sufficient security forces to contain the violence. Media agencies reported on 14 June 2010 that the Russian government was considering a request by the Kyrgyz government. An emergency meeting of the Collective Security Treaty Organisation (CSTO) was held on the same day (14 June) to discuss the role it could play in helping to end the violence.
Ethnic violence waned, according to the Kyrgyz government, by 15 June 2010 and Kyrgyz president Roza Otunbayeva held a news conference that day and declared that there was no need for Russia to send in troops to quell the violence. There were at least 170 people left dead by 15 June 2010 but Pascale Meige Wagner of the International Committee of the Red Cross said the [official] death toll was an underestimate. The UN High Commissioner told reporters in Geneva that evidence suggested that the violence seemed to have been staged up.
Ethnic Uzbeks threatened to blow up an oil depot in Osh if they failed to get guarantees of protection. The United Nations said it believed that the attacks were "orchestrated, targeted and well-planned". Kyrgyz officials told the media that a person suspected to be behind the violence in Jalal-Abad had been detained.

On 2 August 2010, a Kyrgyz government commission began investigating the causes of the clashes. Members of the National Commission, led by former parliament speaker Abdygany Erkebaev, met with people from the predominantly ethnic Uzbek villages of Mady, Shark, and Kyzyl-Kyshtak in the Kara-Suu district of Osh Oblast. This National Commission, including representatives of many ethnic groups, was established by a presidential decree.

President Roza Otunbayeva also said in August 2010 that an international commission would be formed to investigate the clashes. The international commission conducted an extensive investigation and prepared a report—The Independent international commission of inquiry into the events in southern Kyrgyzstan in June 2010 (KIC). It stated that "The Provisional Government, which had assumed power two months before the events, either failed to recognize or underestimated the deterioration in inter-ethnic relations in southern Kyrgyzstan". The KIC concluded that the "Provisional Government had the responsibility to ensure that the security forces were adequately trained and appropriately equipped to deal with situations of civil unrest" but were unable to take necessary measures.

As of today, Kyrgyzstan celebrates its Independence Day annually on August 31, the anniversary of its declaration of independence in 1991. Since independence, Kyrgyzstan has made developments such as creating genuinely free news media and fostering an active political opposition.

In late April 2021, a conflict over water escalated into one of the most serious border clashes between Kyrgyzstan and Tajikistan since independence in 1991.

In September 2022 armed clashes, including the use of artillery, erupted along much of the border between Kyrgyzstan and Tajikistan.

Geography

Kyrgyzstan is a landlocked country in Central Asia, bordering Kazakhstan, China, Tajikistan and Uzbekistan. It lies between latitudes 39° and 44° N, and longitudes 69° and 81° E. It is farther from the sea than any other individual country, and all its rivers flow into closed drainage systems which do not reach the sea. The mountainous region of the Tian Shan covers over 80% of the country (Kyrgyzstan is occasionally referred to as "the Switzerland of Central Asia", as a result), with the remainder made up of valleys and basins.

Issyk-Kul Lake, or Ysyk-Köl in Kyrgyz, in the north-eastern Tian Shan is the largest lake in Kyrgyzstan and the second largest mountain lake in the world after Titicaca. The lowest point is in Kara-Daryya (Karadar'ya) at 132 meters and the highest peaks are in the Kakshaal-Too range, forming the Chinese border. Heavy snowfall in winter leads to spring floods which often cause serious damage downstream. The runoff from the mountains is also used for hydro-electricity.

Kyrgyzstan has significant deposits of metals including gold and rare-earth metals. Due to the country's predominantly mountainous terrain, less than 8% of the land is cultivated, and this is concentrated in the northern lowlands and the fringes of the Fergana Valley.

Bishkek in the north is the capital and largest city, with 937,400 inhabitants. The second city is the ancient town of Osh, located in the Fergana Valley near the border with Uzbekistan. The principal river is the Kara Darya, which flows west through the Fergana Valley into Uzbekistan. Across the border in Uzbekistan it meets another major Kyrgyz river, the Naryn.

The confluence forms the Syr Darya, which originally flowed into the Aral Sea. , it no longer reaches the sea, as its water is withdrawn upstream to irrigate cotton fields in Tajikistan, Uzbekistan, and southern Kazakhstan. The Chu River also briefly flows through Kyrgyzstan before entering Kazakhstan.

Kyrgyzstan contains seven terrestrial ecosystems: Tian Shan montane conifer forests, Alai-Western Tian Shan steppe, Gissaro-Alai open woodlands, Tian Shan foothill arid steppe, Pamir alpine desert and tundra, Tian Shan montane steppe and meadows, and Central Asian northern desert. It had a 2019 Forest Landscape Integrity Index mean score of 8.86/10, ranking it 13th globally out of 172 countries.

Climate

The climate varies regionally. The low-lying Fergana Valley in the southwest is subtropical and extremely hot in summer, with temperatures reaching  The northern foothills are temperate and the Tian Shan varies from dry continental to polar climate, depending on elevation. In the coldest areas temperatures are sub-zero for around 40 days in winter, and even some desert areas experience constant snowfall in this period.

Climate change

Enclaves and exclaves
There is one exclave, the tiny village of Barak (population 627), in the Fergana Valley. The village is surrounded by Uzbek territory. Barak is administratively part of Kara-Suu District in Kyrgyzstan's Osh Region.

There are four Uzbek enclaves within Kyrgyzstan. Chong-Kara is on the Sokh river, between the Uzbek border and the Sokh enclave.

Politics

Political system 

The 1993 constitution defines the form of government as a democratic unicameral republic. The executive branch includes a president and prime minister. The parliament currently is unicameral. The judicial branch comprises a supreme court, local courts and a chief prosecutor.

In March 2002, in the southern district of Aksy, five people protesting the arbitrary arrest of an opposition politician were shot dead by police, sparking nationwide protests. President Askar Akayev initiated a constitutional reform process which initially included the participation of a broad range of government, civil and social representatives in an open dialogue, leading to a February 2003 referendum marred by voting irregularities.

The amendments to the constitution approved by the referendum resulted in stronger control by the president and weakened the parliament and the Constitutional Court. Parliamentary elections for a new, 75-seat unicameral legislature were held on 27 February and 13 March 2005, but were widely viewed as corrupt. The subsequent protests led to a bloodless coup on 24 March 2005, after which Akayev fled the country with his family and was replaced by acting president Kurmanbek Bakiyev.

On 10 July 2005, acting president Bakiyev won the presidential election in a landslide, with 88.9% of the vote, and was inaugurated on 14 August. However, initial public support for the new administration substantially declined in subsequent months as a result of its apparent inability to solve the corruption problems that had plagued the country since its independence from the Soviet Union, along with the murders of several members of parliament. Large-scale protests against president Bakiyev took place in Bishkek in April and November 2006, with opposition leaders accusing the president of failing to live up to his election promises to reform the country's constitution and transfer many of his presidential powers to parliament.

Kyrgyzstan is also a member of the Organization for Security and Cooperation in Europe (OSCE), a league of 57 participating states committed to peace, transparency, and the protection of human rights in Eurasia. As an OSCE participating state, Kyrgyzstan's international commitments are subject to monitoring under the mandate of the U.S. Helsinki Commission.

In December 2008, the state-owned broadcast KTRK announced that it would require prior submission of Radio Free Europe/Radio Liberty programmes, which KTRK are required to retransmit according to a 2005 agreement. KTRK had stopped retransmitting RFE/RL programming in October 2008, a week after it failed to broadcast an RFE/RL programme called Inconvenient Questions which covered the October elections, claiming to have lost the missing material. President Bakiyev had criticised this programme in September 2008, while KTRK told RFE/RL that its programming was too negative. Reporters Without Borders, which ranks Kyrgyzstan 111th out of 173 countries on its Press Freedom Index, strongly criticised the decision.

On 3 February 2009, President Bakiyev announced the imminent closure of the Manas Air Base, the only US military base remaining in Central Asia. The closure was approved by Parliament on 19 February 2009 by a vote of 78–1 for the government-backed bill. However, after much behind-the-scenes negotiation between Kyrgyz, Russian and American diplomats, the decision was reversed in June 2009. The Americans were allowed to remain under a new contract, whereby rent would increase from $17.4 million to $60 million annually.

Kyrgyzstan is among the fifty countries in the world with the highest perceived level of corruption: the 2016 Corruption Perception Index for Kyrgyzstan is 28 on a scale of 0 (most corrupt) to 100 (least corrupt).

In 2010 another revolution erupted in the country (see: April uprising). President Bakiyev, together with his relatives, including his son Maksim and brother Janish—were forced to flee to Kazakhstan and then sought asylum in Belarus. Roza Otunbayeva, who was appointed interim president, announced that she did not intend to run for the Presidential elections in 2011. The election was held in November and won by Prime Minister Almazbek Atambayev, leader of the Social Democratic Party, and Atambayev was sworn in as president on 1 December 2011. Omurbek Babanov was appointed prime minister on the same day and was confirmed on 23 December 2011.

In 2015 Kyrgyzstan became a full-fledged member of the Eurasian Economic Union (EES) after it formally abolished customs controls along its border with Kazakhstan, other members are the former Soviet republics Russia, Kazakhstan, Belarus, and Armenia.

In October 2017, Sooronbay Jeenbekov, a former prime minister backed by incumbent Almazbek Atambayev, was elected as the new President of Kyrgyzstan. In foreign policy he saw the Kremlin as the country's "main strategic partner" and China as an "important strategic and trade partner", but he intended to seek more collaborative bilateral ties with European partners. On 7 August 2019, the Special Forces of Kyrgyzstan launched an operation against the residence of former President Almazbek Atambayev, supposedly based on charges of corruption made against him. In a meeting of the Security Council, President Jeenbekov accused Atambayev of violating the constitution. In October 2020, President Sooronbay Jeenbekov resigned after protests caused by irregularities in parliamentary elections on 4 October 2020.

In January 2021, Sadyr Japarov was elected as the new president after winning the presidential election by a landslide.

In April 2021, the majority of voters approved in the constitutional referendum a new constitution that will give new powers to the president, significantly strengthening the power of the presidency.

Administrative divisions

Kyrgyzstan is divided into seven regions. The regions are subdivided into 44 districts. The districts are further subdivided into rural districts at the lowest level of administration, which include all rural settlements (aýyl ökmötü) and villages without an associated municipal government.

The cities of Bishkek and Osh have status "state importance" and do not belong to any region.

Each region is headed by an akim (regional governor) appointed by the president. District akims are appointed by regional akims.

The regions, and independent cities, are as follows, with subdivisions:
 City of Bishkek
 Lenin District
 Oktyabr District
 Birinchi May District
 Sverdlov District
 Batken Region
 Batken District
 Kadamjay District
 Leylek District
 Chüy Region
 Alamüdün District
 Chüy District
 Jayyl District
 Kemin District
 Moskva District
 Panfilov District
 Sokuluk District
 Ysyk-Ata District
 Jalal-Abad Region
 Aksy District
 Ala-Buka District
 Bazar-Korgon District
 Chatkal District
 Nooken District
 Suzak District
 Toguz-Toro District
 Toktogul District
 Naryn Region
 Ak-Talaa District
 At-Bashy District
 Jumgal District
 Kochkor District
 Naryn District
 Osh Region
 Alay District
 Aravan District
 Chong-Alay District
 Kara-Kulja District
 Kara-Suu District
 Nookat District
 Özgön District
 Talas Region
 Bakay-Ata District
 Kara-Buura District
 Manas District
 Talas District
 Issyk-Kul Region
 Ak-Suu District
 Issyk-Kul District
 Jeti-Ögüz District
 Tong District
 Tüp District
 City of Osh

Military

The armed forces of Kyrgyzstan were formed after the collapse of the Soviet Union and consist of the Land Forces, Air Forces, internal troops, National Guard, and the border guard. The military works with the US Armed Forces, which leased a facility named the Transit Center at Manas at Manas International Airport near Bishkek until June 2014. In recent years, the armed forces have begun developing better relations with Russia including signing modernization deals worth $1.1bn and participating in more exercises with Russian troops. The Agency of National Security works with the military and serves similar purposes to its Soviet predecessor, the KGB. It oversees an elite counterterrorism special forces unit known as "Alfa", the same name used by other former Soviet countries, including Russia and Uzbekistan. The police are commanded by the Ministry of the Interior Affairs, along with the border guard.

Human rights

Kyrgyzstan is classified as a "hybrid regime" in the Democracy Index, ranking 107th out of 167 for 2020. Kyrgyzstan was also ranked "not free" in the 2021 Freedom in the World report with a score of 28/100. In 2020, it was ranked "partly free" with a score of 39/100.

After the installment of a more democratic government, many human rights violations still take place. In a move that alarmed human-rights groups, dozens of prominent Uzbek religious and community leaders were arrested by security forces following the 2010 South Kyrgyzstan riots, including journalist and human-rights activist Azimzhan Askarov. A law banning women under the age of 23 from traveling abroad without a parent or guardian, with the purpose of "increased morality and preservation of the gene pool" passed in the Kyrgyz parliament in June 2013. American diplomats expressed concern in October 2014 when Kyrgyzstan lawmakers passed a law that imposes jail terms on gay-rights activists and others, including journalists, who create "a positive attitude toward non-traditional sexual relations."

Kyrgyzstani activist and journalist Azimzhan Askarov was sentenced to life in prison in 2010. On 24 January 2017, a Kyrgyz court has reinstated a sentence of life imprisonment for Askarov.

Economy

The National Bank of the Kyrgyz Republic serves as the central bank of Kyrgyzstan.

Kyrgyzstan was the ninth poorest country in the former Soviet Union, and is today the second poorest country in Central Asia after Tajikistan. 22.4% of the country's population lives below the poverty line.

Despite the backing of major Western lenders, including the International Monetary Fund (IMF), the World Bank and the Asian Development Bank, Kyrgyzstan has had economic difficulties following independence. Initially, these were a result of the breakup of the Soviet trade bloc and resulting loss of markets, which impeded the republic's transition to a demand economy.

The government has reduced expenditures, ended most price subsidies and introduced a value-added tax. Overall, the government appears committed to the transition to a market economy. Through economic stabilization and reform, the government seeks to establish a pattern of long-term consistent growth. Reforms led to Kyrgyzstan's accession to the World Trade Organization (WTO) on 20 December 1998.

The Kyrgyz economy was severely affected by the collapse of the Soviet Union and the resulting loss of its vast market. In 1990, some 98% of Kyrgyz exports went to other parts of the Soviet Union. Thus, the nation's economic performance in the early 1990s was worse than any other former Soviet republic except war-torn Armenia, Azerbaijan and Tajikistan, as factories and state farms collapsed with the disappearance of their traditional markets in the former Soviet Union. While economic performance has improved considerably in the last few years, and particularly since 1998, difficulties remain in securing adequate fiscal revenues and providing an adequate social safety net. Remittances of around 800,000 Kyrgyz migrants working in Russia contribute to the economy however in recent years, remittances have decreased.

Agriculture is an important sector of the economy in Kyrgyzstan (see agriculture in Kyrgyzstan). By the early 1990s, the private agricultural sector provided between one-third and one-half of some harvests. In 2002, agriculture accounted for 35.6% of GDP and about half of employment. Kyrgyzstan's terrain is mountainous, which accommodates livestock raising, the largest agricultural activity, so the resulting wool, meat and dairy products are major commodities. Main crops include wheat, sugar beets, potatoes, cotton, tobacco, vegetables, and fruit. As the prices of imported agrichemicals and petroleum are so high, much farming is being done by hand and by horse, as it was generations ago. Agricultural processing is a key component of the industrial economy as well as one of the most attractive sectors for foreign investment.

Kyrgyzstan is rich in mineral resources but has negligible petroleum and natural gas reserves; it imports petroleum and gas. Among its mineral reserves are substantial deposits of coal, gold, uranium, antimony, and other valuable metals. Metallurgy is an important industry, and the government hopes to attract foreign investment in this field. The government has actively encouraged foreign involvement in extracting and processing gold from the Kumtor Gold Mine and other regions. The country's plentiful water resources and mountainous terrain enable it to produce and export large quantities of hydroelectric energy.

The principal exports are nonferrous metals and minerals, woollen goods and other agricultural products, electric energy and certain engineering goods. Imports include petroleum and natural gas, ferrous metals, chemicals, most machinery, wood and paper products, some foods and some construction materials. Its leading trade partners include Germany, Russia, China, Kazakhstan, and Uzbekistan. After Beijing launched the Belt and Road Initiative (BRI) in 2013, China has expanded its economic presence and initiated a number of sizable infrastructure projects in Kyrgyzstan.

In regards to telecommunication infrastructure, Kyrgyz Republic ranks last in Central Asia in the World Economic Forum's Network Readiness Index (NRI)—an indicator for determining the development level of a country's information and communication technologies. Kyrgyz Republic ranked number 118 overall in the 2014 NRI ranking, unchanged from 2013 (see Networked Readiness Index).

Kyrgyzstan is ranked 78th among countries for economic freedom by the Heritage Institute.

The COVID-19 pandemic is expected to have a significant negative impact on the Kyrgyz economy that is reliant on services, remittances and natural resources. As a result, in order to mitigate the economic shock and preserve much of the development progress achieved in recent years the World Bank will provide support by financing several projects in the country.

Tourism

One of the most popular tourist destination points in Kyrgyzstan is the lake Issyk-Kul. Numerous hotels, resorts and boarding houses are located along its northern shore. The most popular beach zones are in the city of Cholpon-Ata and the settlements nearby, such as Kara-Oi (Dolinka), Bosteri and Korumdy. The number of tourists visiting the lake was more than a million a year in 2006 and 2007. However, due to the economic and political instability in the region, the number has declined in recent years.

Science and technology

The headquarters of the Kyrgyz Academy of Sciences is located in Bishkek, where several research institutes are located. Kyrgyz researchers are developing useful technologies based on natural products, such as heavy metal remediation for purifying waste water. Kyrgyzstan was ranked 98th in the Global Innovation Index in 2021, down from 90th in 2019.

Demographics

Kyrgyzstan's population is estimated at 6,586,600 in August 2020. Of those, 34.4% are under the age of 15 and 6.2% are over 65. The country is rural: only about one-third of the population live in urban areas. The average population density is 25 people per km2.

Ethnic groups 
The nation's largest ethnic group are the Kyrgyz, a Turkic people, who comprise 74.1% of the population. Other ethnic groups include Russians (5.0%) concentrated in the north and Uzbeks (14.8%) living in the south. Small but noticeable minorities include Dungans (1.1%), Uyghurs (0.9%), Tajiks (0.9%), Kazakhs (0.6%), and Ukrainians (0.1%) and other smaller ethnic minorities. The country has over 80 ethnic groups.

The Kyrgyz have historically been semi-nomadic herders, living in round tents called yurts and tending sheep, horses and yaks. This nomadic tradition continues to function seasonally (see transhumance) as herding families return to the high mountain pasture (or jailoo) in the summer. The sedentary Uzbeks and Tajiks traditionally have farmed lower-lying irrigated land in the Fergana valley.

Kyrgyzstan has undergone a pronounced change in its ethnic composition since independence. The percentage of ethnic Kyrgyz has increased from around 50% in 1979 to over 70% in 2013, while the percentage of ethnic groups, such as Russians, Ukrainians, Germans and Tatars dropped from 35% to about 7%. Since 1991, a large number of Germans, who in 1989 numbered 101,000 persons, have emigrated to Germany.

Languages

Kyrgyz is the state language of Kyrgyzstan. Russian is additionally an official language. 
Kyrgyzstan is one of five former Soviet republics to have Russian as a de jure official language, along with Russia, Belarus, Kazakhstan, and Tajikistan. After the division of the Soviet Union into countries, Kyrgyz was adopted as the "state language" of Kyrgyzstan in 1991. Kyrgyzstan adopted Russian as an "official language" in 1997. The languages have different legal statuses.

Kyrgyz is a Turkic language of the Kipchak branch, closely related to Kazakh, Karakalpak, and Nogay Tatar. It was written in the Arabic alphabet until the twentieth century. The Latin script was introduced and adopted on Stalin's orders in 1928, and was subsequently replaced by Cyrillic script in 1941. A reformed Perso-Arabic alphabet, created by the Kyrgyz intellectual and scientist Kasym Tynystanov is the official script of the Kyrgyz language in the People's Republic of China. As a result of the pending language reform in neighboring Kazakhstan, Kyrgyzstan will be the only independent Turkic-speaking country in a few years that exclusively uses the Cyrillic alphabet.

In 2009, 4.1 million people spoke Kyrgyz as native or second language and 2.5 million spoke Russian as native or second language. Uzbek is the second most common native language with 700,000 native speakers.

Russian TV media enjoy enormous popularity in Kyrgyzstan, especially in the deeply russified city of Bishkek and the Chüy Region, despite that the percentage of Russians today is a fraction of that in 1989. Russian media outlets have an enormous influence on public opinion in Kyrgyzstan, especially in areas such as human rights and international political developments.

Many business and political affairs are carried out in Russian. Until recently, Kyrgyz remained a language spoken at home and was rarely used during meetings or other events. However, most parliamentary meetings today are conducted in Kyrgyz, with simultaneous interpretation available for those not speaking Kyrgyz. According to an RFE/RL article from 2014, despite the attempts to raise the status of Kyrgyz, thousands of Kyrgyz are russifying their names every year (around 40,000), mostly for career prospects, and to remove themselves from the Russian blacklists (people that are to be deported upon entrance) by registering different names. There are also many Russian-language medium schools that are supported from the Russian foundations via the embassy of Russia in Bishkek which are better funded than the Kyrgyz language medium schools. Due to this, many ethnic Kyrgyz go to Russian language medium schools. Many high school students change their surnames annually; for example 800 such changes were recorded in high school students in the region of Naryn.

Urban centres

Religion

Islam is the dominant religion of Kyrgyzstan. The CIA World Factbook estimates that as of 2017, 90% of the population is Muslim, with the majority being Sunni; 7% are Christian, including 3% Russian Orthodoxy, and the remainder are other religions. A 2009 Pew Research Center report indicated 86.3% of Kyrgyzstan's population adhering to Islam. The great majority of Muslims are Sunni, adhering to the Hanafi school of thought, although a 2012 Pew survey report showed that only 23% of respondents to a questionnaire chose to identify themselves as Sunni, with 64% volunteering that they were "just a Muslim". There are a few Ahmadiyya Muslims, though unrecognised by the country.

During Soviet times, state atheism was encouraged. Today, however, Kyrgyzstan is a secular state, although Islam has exerted a growing influence in politics. For instance, there has been an attempt to arrange for officials to travel on hajj (the pilgrimage to Mecca) under a tax-free arrangement.

While Islam in Kyrgyzstan is more of a cultural background than a devout daily practice for many, public figures have expressed support for restoring religious values. For example, human rights ombudsman Tursunbay Bakir-Ulu noted, "In this era of independence, it is not surprising that there has been a return to spiritual roots not only in Kyrgyzstan, but also in other post-communist republics. It would be immoral to develop a market-based society without an ethical dimension."

Additionally, Bermet Akayeva, the daughter of Askar Akayev, the former President of Kyrgyzstan, stated during a July 2007 interview that Islam is increasingly taking root across the nation. She emphasized that many mosques have recently been built and that the Kyrgyz are increasingly devoting themselves to Islam, which she noted was "not a bad thing in itself. It keeps our society more moral, cleaner." There is a contemporary Sufi order present which adheres to a somewhat different form of Islam than the orthodox Islam.

The other faiths practiced in Kyrgyzstan include Russian Orthodox and Ukrainian Orthodox versions of Christianity, practiced primarily by Russians and Ukrainians respectively. A community of 5000 to 10,000 Jehovah's Witnesses gather in both Kyrgyz and Russian-speaking congregations, as well as some Chinese- and Turkish-speaking groups. A small minority of ethnic Germans are also Christian, mostly Lutheran and Anabaptist as well as a Roman Catholic community of approximately 600.

A few Animistic traditions survive, as do influences from Buddhism such as the tying of prayer flags onto sacred trees, though some view this practice rooted within Sufi Islam. There is also a small number of Bukharian Jews living in Kyrgyzstan, but during the collapse of the Soviet Union most fled to other countries, mainly the United States and Israel. In addition, there is a small community of Ashkenazi Jews, who fled to the country from eastern Europe during the Second World War.

On 6 November 2008, the Kyrgyzstan parliament unanimously passed a law increasing the minimum number of adherents for recognizing a religion from 10 to 200. It also outlawed "aggressive action aimed at proselytism", and banned religious activity in schools and all activity by unregistered organizations. It was signed by President Kurmanbek Bakiyev on 12 January 2009.

There have been several reported police raids against peaceful minority religious meetings, as well as reports of officials planting false evidence, but also some court decisions in favour of religious minorities.

Culture

Traditions

 Manas, an epic poem, the plot revolves around a series of events that coincide with the history of the region in the 9th century, primarily the interaction of the Kyrgyz people with other Turkic and Chinese people.
 Komuz, a three-stringed lute
 Tush kyiz, large, elaborately embroidered wall hangings
 Shyrdak and Ala-kiyiz carpets, manufactured by the process of felting, used for yurts. Inscribed in 2012 on the UNESCO List of Intangible Cultural Heritage in Need of Urgent Safeguarding.
 Other textiles, especially made from felt
 Ala kachuu, "bride kidnapping", traditional form of marriage in Kyrgyzstan
 Falconry

Illegal, but still practiced, is the tradition of bride kidnapping. It is debatable whether bride kidnapping is actually traditional. Some of the confusion may stem from the fact that arranged marriages were traditional, and one of the ways to escape an arranged marriage was to arrange a consensual "kidnapping".

Flag
The 40-rayed yellow sun in the center of the national flag represent the 40 tribes that once made up the entirety of Kyrgyz culture before the intervention of Russia during the rise of the Soviet Union. The lines inside the sun represent the crown or tündük (Kyrgyz түндүк) of a yurt, a symbol replicated in many facets of Kyrgyz architecture. The red portion of the flag represents peace and openness of Kyrgyzstan.

Under Soviet rule and before 1992, it had the flag of the Soviet Union with two big blue stripes and a white thin stripe in the middle.

Public holidays

In addition to celebrating the New Year each 1 January, the Kyrgyz observe the traditional New Year festival Nowruz on the vernal equinox. This spring holiday is celebrated with feasts and festivities such as the horse game Ulak Tartish.

This is the list of public holidays in Kyrgyzstan:
 1 January – New Year's Day
 7 January – Orthodox Christmas
 23 February – Fatherland Defender's Day
 8 March – Women's Day
 21–23 March – Nooruz Mairamy, Persian New Year (spring festival)
 7 April – Day of National Revolution 
 1 May – Labor Day
 5 May – Constitution Day
 8 May – Remembrance Day
 9 May – Victory Day
 31 August – Independence Day
 7–8 November – Days of History and Commemoration of Ancestors

Two additional Muslim holidays Orozo Ayt and Qurman (or Qurban) Ayt are defined by the lunar calendar.

Sports

Football is the most popular sport in Kyrgyzstan. The official governing body is the Football Federation of Kyrgyz Republic, which was founded in 1992, after the split of the Soviet Union. It administers the Kyrgyzstan national football team.

Wrestling is also very popular. In the 2008 Summer Olympic Games, two athletes from Kyrgyzstan won medals in Greco-Roman wrestling: Kanatbek Begaliev (silver) and Ruslan Tyumenbayev (bronze).

Ice hockey was not as popular in Kyrgyzstan until the first Ice Hockey Championship was organized in 2009. In 2011, the Kyrgyzstan men's national ice hockey team won 2011 Asian Winter Games Premier Division dominating in all six games with six wins. It was the first major international event that Kyrgyzstan's ice hockey team took part in. The Kyrgyzstan men's ice hockey team joined the IIHF in July 2011.

Bandy is becoming increasingly popular in the country. The Kyrgyz national team took Kyrgyzstan's first medal at the Asian Winter Games, when they captured the bronze. They played in the Bandy World Championship 2012, their first appearance in that tournament.

Martial Arts: Valentina Shevchenko is a Kyrgyzstani–Peruvian professional mixed martial artist who competes in the women's flyweight division of the Ultimate Fighting Championship (UFC), where she was formerly the Women's Flyweight champion.

Boxing: Dmitry Bivol is a Kyrgyzstani Professional Boxer from Tokmok, who competes in the Light Heavyweight Division. Since 2017, he has held the World Boxing Association Light Heavyweight Title. As of August 2019, Bivol is ranked as the world's best active light-heavyweight by the Transnational Boxing Rankings Board and BoxRec, and third by The Ring Magazine.

Kyrgyzstan's national basketball team had its best performance at the official 1995 Asian Basketball Championship where the team surprisingly finished ahead of favorites such as Iran, Philippines and Jordan.

XXI International Issyk-Kul Sports Games (SCO + CIS) was held in 9–17 September 2022 in Baktuu-Dolonotu village (Issyk-Kul). The first three World Nomad Games were held in Cholpon-Ata, Kyrgyzstan. The 6th International Sports Festival Pearl of Kyrgyzstan were held in Issyk-Kul region from June 15 to July 3 of 2022.

Horse riding
The traditional national sports reflect the importance of horse riding in Kyrgyz culture.

Very popular, as in all of Central Asia, is Ulak Tartysh, a team game resembling a cross between polo and rugby in which two teams of riders wrestle for possession of the headless carcass of a goat, which they attempt to deliver across the opposition's goal line, or into the opposition's goal: a big tub or a circle marked on the ground.

Other popular games on horseback include:
 At Chabysh – a long-distance horse race, sometimes over a distance of more than 50 km
 Jumby Atmai – a large bar of precious metal (the "jumby") is tied to a pole by a thread and contestants attempt to break the thread by shooting at it, while at a gallop
 Kyz Kuumai – a man chases a girl in order to win a kiss from her, while she gallops away; if he is not successful she may in turn chase him and attempt to beat him with her "kamchi" (horsewhip)
 Oodarysh – two contestants wrestle on horseback, each attempting to be the first to throw the other from his horse
 Tyin Emmei – picking up a coin from the ground at full gallop

Education

The school system in Kyrgyzstan includes primary (grades 1 to 4, some schools have optional 0 grade), secondary (grades 5 to 9) and high (grades 10 to 11) divisions within one school. Children are usually accepted to primary schools at the age of 6 or 7. It is required that every child finishes 9 grades of school and receives a certificate of completion. Grades 10–11 are optional, but it is necessary to complete them to graduate and receive a state-accredited school diploma. To graduate, a student must complete the 11-year school course and pass 4 mandatory state exams in writing, maths, history and a foreign language.

There are 77 public schools in Bishkek (capital city) and more than 200 in the rest of the country. There are 55 higher educational institutions and universities in Kyrgyzstan, out of which 37 are state institutions.

In September 2016, the University of Central Asia was launched in Naryn, Kyrgyzstan.

There are also various Russian-language medium schools in Bishkek, Osh and other areas. Because of the better funding that they receive in comparation with Kyrgyz state schools, many Kyrgyz go there. In March 2021 Russia announced its plans to create approximately 30 new Russian-language schools in Kyrgyzstan. Teachers from Russia are also working here. However, the existence of these schools has been criticised, for reasons such as the fact that Russian language education has flaws compared to the Turkish and American schools in the country, but also because many ethnic Kyrgyz born after Kyrgyz independence in 1991 can't speak Kyrgyz, but only Russian, according to a Bishkek resident.

Libraries
Kyrgyzstan is home to 1,066 libraries. The National Library of the Kyrgyz Republic is the oldest library in the country, which was established in 1934. Kyrgyz Libraries are working towards expanding access to communities, evident in projects such as the signing of the Marrakesh VIP Treaty and the Open access Portal.

Transport

Transport in Kyrgyzstan is severely constrained by the country's alpine topography. Roads have to snake up steep valleys, cross passes of  altitude and more, and are subject to frequent mudslides and snow avalanches. Winter travel is close to impossible in many of the more remote and high-altitude regions.

Additional problems come from the fact that many roads and railway lines built during the Soviet period are today intersected by international boundaries, requiring time-consuming border formalities to cross where they are not completely closed. Horses are still a much-used transport option, especially in more rural areas; Kyrgyzstan's road infrastructure is not extensive, so horses are able to reach locations that motor vehicles cannot, and they do not require expensive, imported fuel.

Airports
At the end of the Soviet period there were about 50 airports and airstrips in Kyrgyzstan, many of them built primarily to serve military purposes in this border region so close to China. Only a few of them remain in service today. The Kyrgyzstan Air Company provides air transport to China, Russia, and other local countries.
 Manas International Airport near Bishkek is the main international airport, with services to Moscow, Tashkent, Almaty, Urumqi, Istanbul, Baku, and Dubai.
 Osh Airport is the main air terminal in the south of the country, with daily connections to Bishkek, and services to Moscow, Krasnoyarsk, Almaty and more international places.
 Jalal-Abad Airport is linked to Bishkek by daily flights. The national flag carrier, Kyrgyzstan, operates flights on BAe-146 aircraft. During the summer months, a weekly flight links Jalal-Abad with the Issyk-Kul Region.
 Other facilities built during the Soviet era are either closed down, used only occasionally or restricted to military use (e.g., Kant Air Base near Bishkek, which is used by the Russian Air Force).

Banned airline status
Kyrgyzstan appears on the European Union's list of prohibited countries for the certification of airlines. This means that no airline that is registered in Kyrgyzstan may operate services of any kind within the European Union, due to safety standards that fail to meet European regulations.

Railways
The Chüy Valley in the north and the Fergana valley in the south were endpoints of the Soviet Union's rail system in Central Asia. Following the emergence of independent post-Soviet states, the rail lines which were built without regard for administrative boundaries have been cut by borders, and traffic is therefore severely curtailed.

In 2022, construction began on a new 186 km extension of the existing railway from Balykchy to Karakeche. Its primary purpose will be to carry coal from mines at Karakeche to Bishkek.

There are vague plans about extending rail lines from Balykchy in the north and/or from Osh in the south into China, but the cost of construction would be enormous.

In 2022 the president of Kyrgyzstan, Zhaparov, has told local media that he expects construction of the 523 km China–Kyrgyzstan–Uzbekistan (CKU) Railway to begin next year.

Rail connections with adjacent countries
{|
|- style="text-align:left;"
! Neighboring country !! Raillinked?  !! Rail link name  !! Rail gauge notes
|-
| Kazakhstan || Yes || Bishkek branch || Same gauge
|-
| Uzbekistan || Yes || Osh branch || Same gauge
|-
| Tajikistan || No ||   — || Same gauge
|- style="vertical-align:top;"
| China || No ||    —  || Gauge break: 1524 mm vs. 1435 mm
|}

Highways

With support from the Asian Development Bank, a major road linking the north and southwest from Bishkek to Osh has recently been completed. This considerably eases communication between the two major population centres of the country—the Chüy Valley in the north and the Fergana Valley in the South. An offshoot of this road branches off across a 3,500 meter pass into the Talas Valley in the northwest. Plans are now being formulated to build a major road from Osh into China.
 total:  (including  of expressways)
 paved:  (includes some all-weather gravel-surfaced roads)
 unpaved:  (these roads are made of unstabilized earth and are difficult to negotiate in wet weather) (1990)

Ports and harbours
 Balykchy (Ysyk-Kol or Rybach'ye) on Issyk Kul Lake.

See also

 Outline of Kyrgyzstan
 Index of Kyrgyzstan-related articles
 Chinghiz Aitmatov

Notes

References

Further reading

 Historical Dictionary of Kyrgyzstan by Rafis Abazov
 Kyrgyzstan: Central Asia's Island of Democracy? by John Anderson
 Kyrgyzstan: The Growth and Influence of Islam in the Nations of Asia and Central Asia by Daniel E. Harmon
 Lonely Planet Guide: Central Asia by Paul Clammer, Michael Kohn and Bradley Mayhew
 Odyssey Guide: Kyrgyz Republic by Ceri Fairclough, Rowan Stewart and Susie Weldon
 Politics of Language in the Ex-Soviet Muslim States: Azerbaijan, Uzbekistan, Kazakhstan, Kyrgyzstan, Turkmenistan and Tajikistan by Jacob M. Landau and Barbara Kellner-Heinkele. Ann Arbor, University of Michigan Press, 2001. 
 Kyrgyzstan: Traditions of Nomads by V. Kadyrov, Rarity Ltd., Bishkek, 2005. 
 Cities in Kyrgyzstan 
 Bishkek city of Kyrgyzstan 
 Osh city of Kyrgyzstan 
 Jalal-Abad city of Kyrgyzstan

External links

 Government
 President of Kyrgyzstan official site
 Government of Kyrgyzstan official site
 Parliament of Kyrgyzstan official site
 Laws of the Kyrgyz Republic
 General information
 Country Profile from BBC News
 Kyrgyzstan. The World Factbook. Central Intelligence Agency.
 Kyrgyzstan at UCB Libraries GovPubs
 Kyrgyz Publishing and Bibliography
 Key Development Forecasts for Kyrgyzstan from International Futures

Maps
 

 
History of the Kyrgyz people
Central Asian countries
Landlocked countries
Member states of the Commonwealth of Independent States
Member states of the Organisation of Islamic Cooperation
Member states of the Shanghai Cooperation Organisation
Member States of the Eurasian Economic Union
Member states of the United Nations
Member States of the Collective Security Treaty Organization
Republics
Russian-speaking countries and territories
States and territories established in 1991
1991 establishments in Asia
Countries in Asia
Members of the International Organization of Turkic Culture
Member states of the Organization of Turkic States